{{DISPLAYTITLE:Zeta2 Lyrae}}

Zeta2 Lyrae is a single, white-hued star in the northern constellation of Lyra. It is moving closer to the Sun with a radial velocity of −25 km/s.

This star has a stellar classification of F0 IVn, suggesting it is an F-type subgiant star that is evolving away from the main sequence as its supply of hydrogen at the core has been consumed. The n suffix indicates "nebulous" lines caused by its rotation. It is spinning rapidly with a projected rotational velocity of 212 km/s. This is giving the star an oblate shape with an equatorial bulge that is an estimated 29% larger than the polar radius. It has 1.7 times the mass of the Sun, twice the Sun's radius, and is about 1.2 billion years old.

It is a suspected variable.

References

F-type subgiants
Lyra (constellation)
Lyrae, Zeta2
BD+37 3223
Lyrae, 07
173649
091973
7057